St Andrews Bay is a bay of the North Sea located in Fife, Scotland, named for the nearby Royal burgh of St Andrews.

Bays of Scotland
St Andrews
Landforms of Fife